Obiymy Doshchu (translation: Rain's Embrace) is a Ukrainian rock band that describes its music genre as a lyrical, autumnal rock music with progressive rock, neoclassic and doom metal influences.

They have released their debut album Elehia in Autumn 2009 which reviewers called “an outstanding result in the genre” but also “monotonous, with intentionally limited emotional palette”, “expressing the same mood in every track” but “nevertheless one of the most impressive and inspired releases in a long time”, “a new approach to creative work in many ways” and “a phenomenon worth attention of all fans of twilight lyricism”.

Biography

2004—2006, band formation, first recordings 
Obiymy Doshchu was started as a one-man project in 2004 as a result of Volodymyr's interest in writing music, singing and playing an acoustic guitar. His friend Oleksiy became involved in the project and helped Volodymyr record his first demo, and the demo in turn inspired his university mate Mykola to make a video for one of the songs (Mertve Derevo I Viter).

In spring 2006 Volodymyr forms the band with Oleksiy on the keyboards and Mykola on the bass guitar. In this lineup the band makes its first live performance in Kyiv.

In Autumn, Oleksiy replaces keyboards with electric guitar and Andriy Demyanenko joins the band as a keyboards player. The band continues to create new songs and occasionally perform live. During this time, Oleksiy finishes the second video of the band (for the song Zorenko Moya). At the end of the year, Obiymy Doshchu record their second demo with 6 songs.

2007—2008, line-up complete, live activities 
In 2007, the band finally finds a drummer - Serhiy Dumler. The same year Maria joins the band as a keyboards player to replace Andriy Demyanenko.

Having a complete line-up, the bands starts to actively perform live in 2008, plays at many festivals and other places among Ukraine. It also makes its third recording in the studio, Pid Khmaramy, to prepare itself for the upcoming recording of an ambitions debut album.

2009, debut album, first solo concert 
Obiymy Doshchu have finally released their debut album Elehia on August 29, 2009 as a free download on their website. The album contains 8 songs and represents a certain summary of the band's activities since its formation. It is a conceptual album with a single story. It also has rich string arrangements and contains many contributions from guest musicians.

The band played its first big solo concert in Kyiv on October 22, 2009. This day can also be considered as the official day of violist Olena Nesterovska joining the band as a permanent member.

On December 10, the band released a new 2-song single Svitanok and a video for one of the songs directed by Mykola Kryvonos.

2017, second album 
On November 17, 2017 band released their second album "Son" (translation: Dream). Album is 72 minutes long and contains 11 tracks. 15 musicians including a string quartet was and 10 sound engineers was involved in recording, which took over 200 hours in 7 different studios across 3 cities. The album has been mixed by British musician and sound producer Bruce Soord, the frontman of the band The Pineapple Thief, who also worked with such grands of progressive music scene as Opeth, Anathema, Riverside, Tesseract and Blackfield. According to authors album is complex, beautiful, poetic rock music with lush string arrangements and progressive rock, neoclassical, neofolk and post-rock elements.

Album was supported by two singles:
 Single "Kryla" (translation: Wings) was released on October 5, 2017 with interactive web-visualization.
 Single "Razom" (translation: Together) was released on November 2, 2017 also with interactive web-visualization.

Working on the next album 
On February 14, 2020 the band released the first music video for the song Na Vidstani.

Members

Current members 
 Volodymyr Agafonkin — vocals, acoustic guitar (2004—present)
 Oleksiy Katruk — electric guitar (2006—present), keyboards (2005—2006)
 Mykola Kryvonos — bass guitar, flute (2006—present)
 Olena Nesterovska — viola (2009—present)
 Yaroslav Gladilin — drums, percussion (2012—present)
 Yevhen Dubovyk — keyboards (2016—present)

Guest members 
 Hanna Kryvonos — backing vocals
 Yana Shakirzhanova — violin

Guest members occasionally perform live with the band and take part in studio recordings.

Former members 
 Andriy Demyanenko — keyboards (2006—2007)
 Serhiy Dumler — drums, percussion (2006—2012)
 Maria Kurbatova — keyboards (2007—2016)

Discography

Studio albums 
 2009 — Elehia (Елегія)
 2017 — Son (Сон)

Singles 
 2010 — Svitanok (Світанок)
 2017 — Kryla (Крила)
 2017 — Razom (Разом)

Videos 
 2005 — Mertve Derevo I Viter (director: Mykola Kryvonos)
 2006 — Zorenko Moya (director: Oleksiy Katruk)
 2010 — Svitanok (director: Mykola Kryvonos)
2020 — Na Vidstani (director: Andrii Korotych)

References

External links 
 Official Elehia album download page
 Obiymy Doshchu on MySpace
 Obiymy Doshchu on Facebook
 Obiymy Doshchu on Last.fm
  (in Ukrainian)
 Obiymy Doshchu on Twitter (in Ukrainian)

Ukrainian rock music groups